Michael Roman Wasielewski is an American physical chemist. He is currently the Clare Hamilton Hall Professor of Chemistry, Director of the Center for Molecular Quantum Transduction (CMQT), and Executive Director of the Institute for Sustainability and Energy at Northwestern University.

Wasielewski is known for his research on light-driven charge transfer and transport in molecules and materials, photosynthesis, nano scale materials for solar energy conversion, spin dynamics of multi-spin molecules, molecular materials for optoelectronics and spintronics, and time-resolved optical and electron paramagnetic resonance spectroscopy.

Education and early life 
Wasielewski was born on the South Side of Chicago, Illinois, and spent his formative years in close proximity to both the University of Chicago and Chicago's steel making industry. He studied chemistry at University of Chicago under the direction of Leon Stock (B.S. 1971, Ph.D. 1975). His graduate research revealed how the electron-nuclear hyperfine splittings of hydrogen, carbon-13, and fluorine atoms depend on the structure of the paramagnetic molecules. After the completion of his Ph.D., Wasielewski studied antiaromaticity under the direction of Ronald Breslow at Columbia University.

The Wasielewski Group 
Wasielewski joined Northwestern University in 1994. During his time at Northwestern, Wasielewski has collaborated extensively with his colleagues Mark Ratner, Tobin Marks, Fred Lewis, Fraser Stoddart, and others to study molecular charge transfer and photophysics. Currently, the Wasielewski group is organized into three teams:
 Solar Energy Conversion
 Excitonics
 Quantum Information Science

Awards and recognition

 Member, National Academy of Sciences, 2021
Bruker Prize in EPR Spectroscopy, Royal Society of Chemistry, 2021
 Josef Michl American Chemical Society Award in Photochemistry, 2020
 XingDa Lecturer, Peking University, 2019
 Silver Medal in Chemistry, International EPR Society, 2018
 Physical Organic Chemistry Award, Royal Society of Chemistry, 2017
 Fellow, American Academy of Arts and Sciences, 2016
 American Institute of Chemists, Chemical Pioneer Award, 2016
 Honda-Fujishima Lectureship Award, Japanese Photochemistry Association, 2015
 Swiss Chemical Society Lectureship, 2015
 Fellow, Royal Society of Chemistry, UK, 2014
 Royal Society of Chemistry Environment Award, 2013
 Humboldt Research Award, Alexander von Humboldt Foundation, 2013
 Arthur C. Cope Scholar Award, American Chemical Society, 2012
 R. Stephen Berry Lecturer, Telluride Science Center, 2010
 Frontiers of Chemistry Lecturer, Case Western Reserve University, 2010
 Clare Hamilton Hall Endowed Chair, Northwestern University, 2010
 Hutchison Lecturer, University of Rochester, 2009
 Kaufman Lecturer, University of Pittsburgh, 2008
 The Porter Medal for Photochemistry, 2008
 Eminent Scholar Lecturer, University of Arizona, 2007
 James Flack Norris Award in Physical Organic Chemistry, American Chemical Society, 2006
 Closs Lecturer, University of Chicago, 2005
 I-APS Photochemistry Research Award, Inter-American Photochemical Society, 2004
 Pederson Lecturer, Dupont, Inc., 2003
 Weissberger-Williams Lecturer, Eastman Kodak Company, 2001
 W. Heinlen Hall Lecturer, Bowling Green State University, 1999
 R&D 100 Award (sponsored by R&D Magazine) for work in photorefractivity, 1996
 Fellow of the American Association for the Advancement of Science, 1995
 Holland Research School for Molecular Chemistry Lecturer, 1995
 R&D 100 Award (sponsored by R&D Magazine) for work in molecular switches, 1993
 Argonne Pacesetter Award, 1993
 W. E. Heraeus Foundation Fellow, University of Stuttgart, 1992
 Inaugural Lecturer, Center for Photomolecular Sciences, Imperial College of Science, Technology, and Medicine, London, 1991
 Nodzu Memorial Lecturer, Kyoto University, 1991
 University of Chicago Award for Distinguished Performance at Argonne National Laboratory, 1989
 Elizabeth R. Norton Prize for Excellence in Research in Chemistry at the University of Chicago, 1975
 Fannie and John Hertz Foundation Fellow, 1972 1974

References 

1949 births
Living people
University of Chicago alumni
American physical chemists
American people of Polish descent
Members of the United States National Academy of Sciences